Thabaung is a town in the Ayeyarwady Region of south-west Myanmar. It is the seat of the Thabaung Township in the Pathein District. The Ngawun river runs through the town.

References

Populated places in Ayeyarwady Region
Township capitals of Myanmar